A purity test is a self-graded survey that assesses the participants' supposed degree of innocence in worldly matters (sex, drugs, deceit, and other activities assumed to be vices), generally on a percentage scale with 100% being the most and 0% being the least pure.  Online purity tests were among the earliest of Internet memes, popular on Usenet beginning in the early 1980s. However, similar types of tests circulated under various names long before the existence of the Internet.

Historical examples
The Columbia University humor magazine, The Jester, reported in its October 1935 issue on a campus wide "purity test" conducted at Barnard College in 1935. The issue of The Jester was briefly censored, with distribution curtailed until the director of activities at the university could review the article. According to the editor-in-chief of The Jester, "We printed the survey to clear up some of the misconceptions that Columbia and the outside world have about Barnard girls," he said. "The results seem to establish that Barnard girls are quite regular. I fail to see anything off-color in the story. It's a sociological study."

In 1936, The Indian Express reported that students at Toronto University were "under-going a 'purity test', which took "the form of twenty very personal questions, designed to determine the state of their morals and their 'purity ratio'. For example, so many marks are lost for smoking, drinking, and every time the sinner kisses a girl or boy. Then, after truthfully answering all the questions, the total number of bad marks are added up and subtracted from a hundred. What is left, if any, is the 'purity ratio'. The test is unofficial and just what it will prove when completed nobody knows."

Alan Dundes, a professor of anthropology and folklore at the University of California, Berkeley, and Carl R. Pagter included examples of purity tests in their 1975 book Work Hard and You Shall Be Rewarded: Urban Folklore from the Paperwork Empire. They noted, "An indication of the particular sexual activities that are valued is provided by various versions of a questionnaire parody entitled 'Virtue Test' or 'Official Purity Test' or the like. It is obviously doubtful whether anyone would answer the questions posed on the test in an honest and truthful fashion. Nevertheless, the questions themselves serve to reveal a good deal about the American male's sexual fantasy life." Dundes and Pagter's book reprints a "Virtue Test" circulated at Indiana University in 1939 and a more contemporary "Official Purity Test" circulated at California Institute of Technology.

In 1976, a teacher at La Grange High School in Texas was fired for distributing a purity test, which had appeared in Ann Landers' column, to her students. The questions on the test ranged from "Ever said 'I love you'?" to "Ever had group sex?" The teacher sued the school district and was awarded $71,000 in back pay and damages.

Description

Most purity tests have possible scores anywhere from 0% to 100%. Purity tests ask numerous personal questions of their users, most commonly about the use of alcohol and illicit substances; sexual acts with members of the opposite or same-sex; other illicit or illegal activities, and the above actions in an odd or "kinky" context.  These tests typically have anywhere from 50 to 2000 questions.

Many popular purity tests encourage participation in a social situation (one person reading a purity test aloud while others mark down their "yeses" for later tabulation). The tests often acknowledge that some may use them as a checklist for things to do, try, or accomplish.

One of the best-known purity tests is The Unisex Purity Test (or, simply, the Purity Test). First written before 1980 in the Massachusetts Institute of Technology Baker House, the first incarnation had two parallel versions, 100 questions each; one for male, and one for female. The next iteration (247 questions, written at Carnegie Mellon University in 1983) heralded the merging of the gendered versions, making it unisex. Over the next decade or so, many re-writes and expansions commenced, a 2000-question version being written in 1995. In more recent times, versions of the classic test have been developed for new platforms, such as a purity test for TikTok and Facebook applications. 

Rice Purity Test is a quiz consisting of 100 questions about your sexual life, relationship, and habits. The average purity test calculates your quiz scores after marking your 100 questions. The Purity test also called "The Innocence test" which is originated at Rice University. It's 100 questions survey for girls & boys in different age groups. The Rice Purity Test has historically served as a segue from O-week to true college life at Rice.

In popular culture 
Veronica Mars season 1 episode 8 ("Like a Virgin") focuses on a purity test and the effects of the release of its results on a high school.

Big Mouth season 6 episode 4 ("Rice Purity Test") focuses on the main characters taking a purity test.

References

Sources

External links
 Official Rice Purity Test
Human sexuality
Internet culture
Personality tests